The Karuma Hydroelectric Power Station is a 600 MW hydroelectric power project under construction in Uganda. When completed, it will be the largest power-generating installation in the country.

Location
The power station is located on the Victoria Nile, at the former location of the Karuma Falls. The geographical coordinates of Karuma Hydroelectric Power Station are:02°14'51.0"N, 32°16'05.0"E
(Latitude:2.247500; Longitude:32.268056).

History
As far back as 1995, the government of Uganda planned to construct a hydropower station at the site of the Karuma Falls. Initially, Norpak, a Norwegian energy company, was awarded the contract to perform the feasibility study and the environmental impact assessment (EIA) for the dam. The World Bank promised to make a loan available to pay for the construction. The feasibility study report was made available in October 2006. Bids for construction of the project went out in November 2006. Initially, the plan was to build a 200-250 megawatt power station.

In 2009, the plans were redrawn, calling for a much larger project of 750 megawatts. Sometime during 2009, Norpak pulled out of the negotiations with the Ugandan government, citing the Global Recession of 2008 to 2012.

The Ugandan government then contracted with Energy Infratech Private Limited to perform a new feasibility study and a new EIA, given that a larger power station was now being planned. At that time, construction was expected to start in 2012 and last six years.

In July 2011, media reports indicated that the maximum capacity of the project had been scaled back to 600 megawatts from 750 megawatts. Some international development partners wanted to scale back even further, to a maximum capacity of 400 to 450 megawatts.

Technical specifications

Construction costs
In January 2011, Energy Infratech Private Limited, the Indian company contracted to perform the feasibility study for the project, said the estimated total cost for the dam and power plant was approximately US $2.2 billion. That figure included the cost needed to build a transmission line from Karuma to a location where the power will be integrated into the national power grid.

The power generated will be transmitted via high voltage wires to three substations as follows: (a) a  400 kilovolt line to Kawanda UETCL Substation in Wakiso District (b) an  132 kilovolt line to Lira and (c) a  400 kilovolt line to a substation in Olwiyo, Nwoya District. The construction costs for the high voltage transmission lines are estimated at US$250 million. In June 2013, the Ugandan government awarded the construction contract to Sinohydro, a Chinese construction company. Work began in the second half of 2013 and is expected to last five years. Construction costs will be jointly funded by the Ugandan and Chinese governments. In June 2014, the Exim Bank of China committed in writing to fund 85 percent of the construction costs, in the form of a concessionary loan repayable in five years. The Ugandan government will fund the remaining 15 percent of the cost.

In March 2015, the Ugandan Parliament assented to two loans totalling US$1.435 billion, from the Export-Import (EXIM) Bank of China, for the construction of the power station. Of that amount, US$789.3 million will be loaned at 2 percent per annum, repayable over 20 years, while US$645.82 million will attract 4 percent interest, payable over 15 years, effective the day the dam is fully commissioned. Uganda has already invested US$253.26 million to start the construction. That brings the total funds committed to the project as, of March 2015, to US $1,688,380,000.

As of June 2018, with approximately 76 percent of the work completed, the total construction budget was quoted at US$1.7 billion, with US$1.4 billion for construction of the power station, and US$300 million going towards the new transmission lines and new substations.

Construction work

The construction of the dam and power station officially started on 12 August 2013. In March 2015, Sinohydro, the lead contractor on the project, contracted with Alstom to provide equipment and technical services to the power station, in a deal worth US$65 million. The equipment includes six 100 megawatt Francis turbines and related equipment. At the peak of construction, it is expected that a total of 2,500 casual and permanent workers will be hired. The power station is expected to be commissioned in 2018.

As of March 2016, about 30 percent of the work had been completed. In October 2016, it was estimated that about 1,000 Chinese nationals and about 5,000 Ugandans were working at the power station.

In February 2018, the Red Pepper Newspaper reported that work equivalent to 74 percent of the entire project had been completed and commissioning of the power station was expected in December 2018.

As of June 2018, fifty-six months since the beginning of construction, an estimated 76 percent of the physical work had been completed. Of the 6,000 workers, 5,300 are Ugandan. The first 200 MW of power are expected online in December 2018, and the rest in 2019. Each unit of power is expected to cost the consumer US$0.049 for the first 10 years of the life of the power station, after which the price will drop down to US$0.020 per unit, for the next 15 years. Three new substations, one each at Karuma, Kawanda and Olwiyo, are part of the construction contract. The substation at Lira will also undergo an upgrade to accommodate power from Karuma.

As of April 2019, the Daily Monitor newspaper reported that the work on the power station was approximately 80 percent complete, while the three high voltage transmission lines were 80 to 85 percent complete. Commissioning of the completed power station is expected in December 2019.

In September 2019, an estimated 95 percent of construction had been completed. This included 100 percent completion of the Karuma–Lira High Voltage Line, 100 percent of the Karuma–Kawanda High Voltage Power Line and 98 percent of the Karuma–Olwiyo High Voltage Line. Commissioning of the power station is planned for December 2019.

Recent developments
In addition to the high voltage transmission lines to Lira, Olwiyo and Kawanda, that belong to Uganda Electricity Transmission Company Limited (UETCL), Umeme, the largest national distributor will spend USh4 billion (US$1.1 million) to construct a network of 33kV lines from Karuma to Kigumba and on to the districts of Lira,  Gulu, Masindi and  Hoima. Commissioning of the power station had been moved to November 2020.

In May 2021, following touring of the work site, the chairperson of the board of Uganda Electricity Generation Company Limited (UEGCL), Engineer Proscovia Margaret Njuki, set the date of commissioning as 22 June 2022. In June 2021 it was reported that 98.8 percent of the work was complete with the contractor having already addressed some of the works that didn't conform with the plans and actively working on the rest.

In July 2022, the Daily Monitor reported that the power station would be brought online, one turbine at a time, with the first 100 MW unit starting in October 2022 and the sixth and final unit commissioned in June 2023.

Photos and diagrams
 Photo of Karuma Falls at Gorillatales.com

Lira–Gulu–Agago High Voltage Power Line

The Lira–Gulu–Agago High Voltage Power Line is a planned high voltage power line in the  Northern Region of Uganda.

Location
The 132 kilovolt power line would start at the 132 kV Uganda Electricity Transmission Company Limited (UETCL) substation at Lira.

Overview
This power line is intended to distribute electricity generated from power stations on the Victoria Nile to the Northern Region of Uganda. It is also intended to evacuate power from the Achwa Hydroelectricity Power Station Complex, including Achwa 2 Hydroelectric Power Station, under construction as of January 2018, and Achwa 3 Hydroelectric Power Station, under development. The main objective is to improve the quantity, quality and reliability of electricity supplied to the region.

Construction
As of June 2017, the website of the Electricity Regulatory Authority, stated that (a) preparation for implementation of the population resettlement plan were underway, (b) the updated feasibility study was in its final stages, (c) the pre-qualification of the contractors was ongoing and (d) the tender evaluation had been concluded. The scope of work involves the construction of a new 132kV electricity substation at Agago. In January 2016, the  German government committed to lend €40 million, on soft terms, towards the construction of this power line.

See also

References

External links
 Karuma Power Dam: Steering Committee Inspects Works With Progress At 94 Percent As at 25 June 2019.
 Environmental Impact Assessment By NEMA
 Potential Hydropower Projects In Uganda

Hydroelectric power stations in Uganda
Oyam District
Kiryandongo District
Underground power stations
Dams under construction